Bengt Kamis (born 20 June 1943) is a Swedish sports shooter. He competed in the men's 10 metre air pistol event at the 1988 Summer Olympics.

References

External links
 

1943 births
Living people
Swedish male sport shooters
Olympic shooters of Sweden
Shooters at the 1988 Summer Olympics
People from Vörå